Is a group of signs and symptoms consisting of Haglund's deformity in combination with retrocalcaneal bursitis. It is often accompanied by Achilles tendinitis.

Haglund's deformity 
Haglund's deformity was first described by Patrick Haglund in 1927. It is also known as retrocalcaneal exostosis, Mulholland deformity, and ‘pump bump.' It is a very common clinical condition, but still poorly understood. Haglund's deformity is an abnormality of the bone and soft tissues in the foot. An enlargement of the bony section of the heel (where the Achilles tendon is inserted) triggers this condition. The soft tissue near the back of the heel can become irritated when the large, bony lump rubs against rigid shoes.

Diagnosis 
The etiology is not well known, but some probable causes like a tight Achilles tendon, a high arch of the foot, and heredity have been suggested as causes. Middle age is the most common age of affection, females are more affected than males, and the occurrence is often bilateral. A clinical feature of this condition is pain in the back of the heel, which is more after rest. Clinical evaluation and lateral radiographs of the ankle are mostly enough to make a diagnosis of Haglund's syndrome.

Prevention 
To help prevent a recurrence of Haglund's deformity:

 wear appropriate shoes; avoid shoes with a rigid heel back
 use arch supports or orthotic devices
 perform stretching exercises to prevent the Achilles tendon from tightening
 avoid running on hard surfaces and running uphill

Known Treatments 

 Haglund's syndrome is often treated conservatively by altering the heel height in shoe wear, orthosis, physiotherapy, and anti-inflammatory drugs. Surgical excision of the bony exostoses of the calcaneum is only required in resistant cases.
 Keck and Kelly Wedge Osteotomy
 Excision of the retrocalcaneal bursa. 
 Calcaneal osteotomy.
 Osseous debridement from the Achilles tendon.
 Retrocalcaneal enthesophyte resection with functional Achilles tendon lengthening and buried knots.

References

Foot diseases
Syndromes